Condylostylus occidentalis is a species of long-legged fly in the family Dolichopodidae.

References

Sciapodinae
Articles created by Qbugbot
Insects described in 1888
Taxa named by Jacques-Marie-Frangile Bigot